Manche Masemola (1913–1928) was a South African Christian martyr.

Early life 

Masemola was born in Marishane, a small village near Jane Furse, in South Africa.  She lived with her parents, two older brothers, a sister, and a cousin. German and then English missionaries had worked in the Transvaal Colony for several decades and by the early twentieth century there was a small Christian community among the Pedi people which was widely viewed with distrust by the remainder of the tribe who still practiced the traditional religion.

Martyrdom 

By 1919, an Anglican Community of the Resurrection mission was established by Fr. Augustine Moeka in Marishane. Masemola attended classes in preparation for baptism with her cousin Lucia, against the wishes of her parents. Her parents took her to a Sangoma (African traditional healer), claiming that she had been bewitched. She was prescribed a traditional remedy, which her parents made her consume by beating her.  Relations worsened, and the mother hid the girl's clothes so she could not attend Christian instructional classes. On February 4, 1928, her parents led the teenager to a lonely place, where they killed her, burying her by a granite rock on a remote hillside.

Manche had said that she would be baptized in her own blood. She died without having been baptized. Manche's mother converted to Christianity and was baptised forty years later in 1969.

Manche was declared a martyr by the Church of the Province of Southern Africa in less than ten years.

Commemoration 

The Anglican Church of Southern Africa commemorates Manche in its Calendar of saints on the 4th day of February each year, as do some other churches in the Anglican Communion.  She is one of the ten 20th-century martyrs from across the world who are depicted in statues above the Great West Door of Westminster Abbey, London.

Manche Masemola is honored with a Lesser Feast on the liturgical calendar of the Episcopal Church in the United States of America on February 4.

Notes and references

External links 
 Manche Masemola: a Timeline

1913 births
1928 deaths
Anglican saints
20th-century Protestant martyrs
20th-century Christian saints
Christian female saints of the Late Modern era